Shared Secrets is an album by pianist George Cables that was recorded in 2001 and released by the MuseFX label.

Reception

The AllMusic review by Scott Yanow said "This intriguing set for pianist George Cables is in some ways a throwback to the 1970s. Although he has often played hard bop in recent times, in the '70s he was more eclectic, so he is heard on both acoustic and electric pianos. The music (all his originals except for the spiritual "Go Down Moses") is soulful and sometimes funky, hinting at 1970s fusion and pop in spots while still swinging. ... This small label release is worth searching for".

Track listing 
All compositions by George Cables except where noted
 "5 Will Get Ya 10" – 6:06
 "Blackfoot" – 5:19
 "S.F.C.B." – 5:06
 "Secrets of Love" – 6:33
 "Spookarella" – 5:04
 "Beyond Forever" – 5:58
 "Phantom of the City" – 6:00
 "Just Suppose" – 5:02
 "Why Not?" – 5:37
 "Go Down Moses" (Traditional) – 6:16

Personnel 
George Cables – piano, electric piano
Ralph Rickert – trumpet, flugelhorn
Gary Bartz – soprano saxophone, alto saxophone
Bennie Maupin - bass clarinet, tenor saxophone
Larry Klimas – baritone saxophone, soprano saxophone, tenor saxophone, flute
Alphonso Johnson, Abraham Laboriel - bass 
Vinnie Colaiuta, Peter Erskine – drums
Luis Conte – timbales

References 

George Cables albums
2001 albums